Christopher Kelly Browne (May 16, 1952 – February 5, 2023) was an American comic strip artist and cartoonist. He was the son of cartoonist Dik Browne and brother of cartoonist Chance Browne. From 1989 to 2023, Browne wrote and drew the comic strip Hägar the Horrible, which is distributed by King Features Syndicate.

Life and career
Born in South Orange, New Jersey, on May 16, 1952, and growing up in suburban Wilton, Connecticut, Browne assisted his father on the comic strips Hi and Lois and Hägar the Horrible. He contributed to Hägar from the beginning of the comic in 1972 and co-authored Hägar the Horrible's Very Nearly Complete Viking Handbook in 1985. When Dik Browne died in 1989, Chris Browne continued the strip, both writing and drawing, while Chance Browne took over Hi and Lois.

Chris Browne also created two short-lived autobiographical comic strips: "Chris Browne's Comic Strip" (1993 – 1994) and "Raising Duncan" (2000 – 2004). Both include a Scottie dog (Scottish Terrier) as a common feature.

Browne lived in Sioux Falls, South Dakota, where he died on February 5, 2023, at the age of 70.

Comic and artistic work
Hägar the Horrible is translated into 13 languages and appears in 45 countries.

References

External links
My Sketchbooks blog
Lambiek Comiclopedia biography.
My Raising Duncan comic strip
Billy Ireland Cartoon Library & Museum Art Database

American comics artists
American comic strip cartoonists
1952 births
2023 deaths
People from South Orange, New Jersey
People from Wilton, Connecticut